List of steam powered ships of the line

Austria 
  - launched 1858, 5811 tons

Britain 
See List of ships of the line of the Royal Navy#List of unarmoured steam ships-of-the-line of the Royal Navy (1847-61)

18 built, 41 converted

Denmark 
 Dannebrog. Launched 1850. Converted to screw ironclad 1875. 
 Skjold. Launched 1834. Converted to screw 1858-1860. Served in the Second Schleswig War in 1864.

France 
10 built, 28 converted
 Napoléon class
 Napoléon
 Duquesne

 Algésiras class (5 ships)

Converted 
Océan class

 Souverain: laid down in Toulon in 1813, launched in 1819. Converted to sail/steam and entered service in 1857. Used as gunnery training vessel from 1860. Stricken in 1867. Hulk scrapped in 1905.
 Ville-de-Paris: laid down in 1806 at Rochefort as Marengo; renamed to Ville-de-Vienne in 1807, Comte-d'Artois in 1814, and Ville-de-Paris in 1830. Launched in 1850. Entered Service in 1851, Converted to a dual sail/steam ship in 1858, engine removed and converted to transport in 1870. Stricken in 1882; hulk used as floating barracks until scrapped in 1898.
 Louis-XIV: laid down as Le Tonnant in 1811 at Rochefort; renamed to Louis-XIV in 1828, launched in 1854. Entered service in 1854. Converted to a dual sail/steam ship in 1857. Transferred to the gunnery training school in 1861. Out of service 1873, stricken in 1880, scrapped in 1882.

Hercule class
 Prince Jérôme

Naples 
 Re Galantuomo. Launched 1850 as Monarca. Converted in 1858, renamed in 1860. Broken up in 1875.

Russia 

Oryol 84 (1854) (completed as screw) - Decommissioned in 1863
Retvisan 84 (1855) (completed as screw) - Converted to sail 1863, to target vessel 1874, decommissioned 1880
Imperator Nikolai I 111/109 (1860) (screw) - Decommissioned 1874
Tsesarevitch 135/115 (1857) - Transferred to the Baltic Fleet 1858-1859, converted to screw 1860, decommissioned 1874
Sinop (ex-Bosfor - renamed on slip) 130 (1858) - Transferred to the Baltic Fleet 1858-1859, converted to screw 1860, decommissioned 1874

Converted

Leipzig-class (1 of 2 units)

Gangut 84 (1825) - Converted to screw 1854, training ship 1862, decommissioned 1871

Imperatritsa Aleksandra-class (1 of 8 units)

Vola 84/92 (1837) - Converted to screw 1856, later become training ship, BU 1889

Fershampenuaz-class (2 of 3 units)

Konstantin 74/82 (1837) - Converted to screw 1854, decommissioned 1864
Vyborg 74/82 (1841) - Converted to screw 1854, decommissioned 1863

Sweden 
 Karl XIV Johan, launched 1824. Converted 1854. Scrapped 1867.
 Stockholm, launched 1856, converted on stocks. Later training and accommodation ship. Scrapped 1923.

Turkey 
 Peyk-i Zafer, 86 cannons. Launched 1842, converted 1851, decommissioned 1878.

References 

Ships of the line